Bagga Shaikhan is a village in Rawat, Islamabad on Chak Beli Khan Rawat road. It is located at 33.4659° N, 73.1925° E with an altitude of 570 meters (1870 ft).

Telecommunication
The PTCL provides the main network of landline telephone. Many ISPs and all major mobile phone, Wireless companies operating in Pakistan provide service in Bagga Shaikhan.

Languages
Punjabi is the main language of Bagga Shaikhan, other languages are Urdu Pothohari , and rarely spoken language Pashto.

References

Islamabad